Sunshine Glacier is a glacier, 3 nautical miles (6 km) long and 2 nautical miles (3.7 km) wide, flowing south into Iceberg Bay on the south coast of Coronation Island, in the South Orkney Islands. It is the largest glacier on the south side of Coronation Island and terminates in ice cliffs up to 60 m high. Surveyed in 1948-49 by the Falkland Islands Dependencies Survey (FIDS) and so named by them because, when all else was in shadow, small gaps in the clouds above frequently allowed patches of sunshine to appear on the surface of this glacier. At the west side of Sunshine Glacier stands the conspicuous black ridge of Beaufoy Ridge, rising to 650 metres (2,130 ft) at its northwest end.

See also
 List of glaciers in the Antarctic
 Glaciology

Coronation Island
Glaciers of the South Orkney Islands